Azar Motor Industrial Co or AMICO is an Iranian truck manufacturer established in 1989 and located in Jolfa near Tabriz. This company produces light and heavy diesel vehicles.

AzarMotor Industrial Company, known as AMICO, was founded fully by private sector and as a family business in 1989, with the aim of producing tractors and agricultural equipment.

Soon after establishment and following its strategies of participation in development of the national and regional industries and technologies and raise of employment rate as an entrepreneur, AMICO Industrial Group launched a motorcycle production line and continued by establishing numerous factories for different products during the last 30 years.

Aras Khodro Diesel (AMICO- reg no. 59) with a registered capital of 1,400,000,000,000 IRR, possessing more than 85000 m2 of workshops including two assembly and production platforms, a Painting Line equipped with ED for a wide range of Light and Heavy duty commercial vehicles, Testing Line, and warehouses as well as 250000 m2 of lands, is the most important subsidiary of the AMICO Industrial Group.

Amico spare parts, the first and largest online store of Amico spare parts

References

Truck manufacturers of Iran
Vehicle manufacturing companies established in 1989
Economy of Iranian Azerbaijan